A green party is a political party based on the principles of green politics.

Green Party or Greens Party may also refer to:
 Albania: Green Party of Albania
 Australia: Australian Greens
 Austria: The Greens – The Green Alternative
 Belarus: Belarusian Green Party
 Belize: Belize Green Independent Party
 Bolivia: Green Party of Bolivia
 Brazil: Green Party (Brazil)
 Bulgaria: Green Party of Bulgaria
 Burundi: Green Party-Intwari
 Canada: Green Party of Canada
 Alberta: Alberta Greens, 1986–2009
 Alberta: Green Party of Alberta, 2011–present
 British Columbia: Green Party of British Columbia
 Vancouver: Green Party of Vancouver
 Manitoba: Green Party of Manitoba
 New Brunswick: Green Party of New Brunswick
 Nova Scotia: Green Party of Nova Scotia
 Ontario: Green Party of Ontario
 Prince Edward Island: Green Party of Prince Edward Island
 Quebec: Green Party of Quebec
 Saskatchewan: Green Party of Saskatchewan
 Yukon: Yukon Green Party
 Chile: Green Ecologist Party (Chile)
 Colombia: Oxygen Green Party, 1998–2005
 Colombia: Green Party (Colombia)
 Costa Rica:
 Cartago: Cartago Green Party
 Croatia: Green Party – Green Alternative
 Czech Republic: Green Party
 Dominican Republic: Green Socialist Party
 Egypt: Egyptian Green Party
 Europe: European Green Party
 Fiji: Green Party of Fiji, 2008–13
 Finland: Green Party (Finland)
 France: Green Party (France)
 Georgia: Green Party of Georgia
 Germany: Green Party (Germany)
 East Germany: East German Green Party, 1990 only
 Hungary: Green Party of Hungary, 1989–2011
 Hungary: Hungarian Social Green Party
 Hungary: Party of Greens (Hungary)
 Iceland: Right-Green People's Party, 2010–16
 India: India Greens Party
 Iran: Green Party of Iran
 Iraq: Green Party of Iraq
 Ireland: Green Party - An Comhaontas Glas 
 Israel: The Greens (Israel) and Green Party (Israel)
 Japan: Green Party of Japan
 Kenya: Mazingira Green Party of Kenya
 Kosovo: Green Party of Kosovo
 Latvia: Latvian Green Party
 Lebanon: Green Party of Lebanon
 Lithuania: Lithuanian Green Party
 Luxembourg: Green Party
 Madagascar: Madagascar Green Party
 Malaysia: Green Party of Malaysia
 Mexico: Ecologist Green Party of Mexico
 Moldova: Ecologist Green Party (Moldova)
 Mongolia: Civil Will–Green Party
 Mongolia: Mongolian Green Partyx
 Mozambique: Greens Party of Mozambique
 Netherlands: Green Party of the Netherlands
 Netherlands: The Greens
 New Zealand: Green Party of Aotearoa New Zealand
 New Zealand: Progressive Green Party, 1995–96
 Nicaragua: Ecologist Green Party of Nicaragua
 Norway: Green Party (Norway)
 Pakistan: Green Party of Pakistan
 Peru: Green Alternative Ecologist Party of Peru
 Philippines: Philippine Green Republican Party
 Poland: Green Party of Poland
 Portugal: Ecologist Party "The Greens"
 Romania: Green Party (Romania)
 Russia: Russian Ecological Party "The Greens"
 Rwanda: Democratic Green Party of Rwanda
 Saint Vincent and the Grenadines: Saint Vincent and the Grenadines Green Party
 Serbia: Green Party (Serbia)
 Slovakia: Green Party (Slovakia)
 Slovakia: Slovak Green Party
 Slovenia: Youth Party – European Greens
 Somalia: Somalia Green Party
 South Africa: Green Party of South Africa
 South Korea: Green Party Korea
 Spain: Green Party (Spain)
 Sweden: Green Party (Sweden)
 Switzerland: Green Liberal Party of Switzerland
 Switzerland: Green Party of Switzerland
 Taiwan: Green Party Taiwan
 Tunisia: Green Tunisia Party
 Turkey: Greens Party (Turkey), 2008–12
 Turkey: Green Left Party
 Uganda: Uganda Green Party
 Ukraine: Party of Greens of Ukraine
 United Kingdom: Raving Loony Green Giant Party, 1989–93
 United Kingdom: Green Party (UK), 1973–90
 England and Wales: Green Party of England and Wales
 London: London Green Party
 Wales: Wales Green Party
 Northern Ireland: Green Party Northern Ireland
 Scotland: Scottish Greens
 United States: Greens/Green Party USA
 United States: Green Party of the United States
 Alaska: Green Party of Alaska
 Arizona: Arizona Green Party
 Arkansas: Green Party of Arkansas
 California: Green Party of California
 Colorado: Green Party of Colorado
 Connecticut: Connecticut Green Party
 Delaware: Green Party of Delaware
 District of Columbia: D.C. Statehood Green Party
 Florida: Green Party of Florida
 Hawaii: Green Party of Hawaii
 Idaho: Idaho Green Party
 Illinois: Illinois Green Party
 Iowa: Iowa Green Party
 Kansas: Kansas Green Party
 Kentucky: Kentucky Green Party
 Louisiana: Green Party of Louisiana
 Maine: Maine Green Independent Party
 Maryland: Maryland Green Party
 Massachusetts: Green-Rainbow Party
 Michigan: Green Party of Michigan
 Minnesota: Green Party of Minnesota
 Mississippi: Green Party of Mississippi
 Montana: Montana Green Party
 Nebraska: Nebraska Green Party
 New Jersey: Green Party of New Jersey
 New Mexico: Green Party of New Mexico
 New York: Green Party of New York
 Ohio: Green Party of Ohio
 Oklahoma: Green Party of Oklahoma
 Oregon: Pacific Green Party
 Pennsylvania: Green Party of Pennsylvania
 Rhode Island: Green Party of Rhode Island
 South Carolina: South Carolina Green Party
 Texas: Green Party of Texas
 Vermont: Vermont Green Party
 Virginia: Green Party of Virginia
 Washington: Green Party of Washington State
 West Virginia: West Virginia Green Party
 Wisconsin: Wisconsin Green Party

See also
 List of green political parties
 Greens (disambiguation)
 The Greens (disambiguation)
 Progressive Green Party (disambiguation)